Hendrikus 'Drikus' Hattingh  (born 21 February 1968) is a former South African rugby union player, who played at lock.

Playing career
Hattingh played Craven Week rugby for Western Transvaal in 1985. He made his provincial debut for Northern Transvaal in 1991 and his international debut for the Springboks on 22 August 1992 against Australia at Newlands in Cape Town, when he replaced Adri Geldenhuys in the first half. Hattingh played in five test matches and twelve tour matches for the Springboks, scoring four tries in tour matches.

Test history

See also
List of South Africa national rugby union players – Springbok no. 568

References

1968 births
Living people
South African rugby union players
South Africa international rugby union players
Blue Bulls players
People from Rustenburg
Rugby union players from North West (South African province)
Rugby union locks